Plan A is a 2021 film written and directed by Yoav and Doron Paz.

Cast

Plot 
In the post-war period, a group of German-Polish Jews and Holocaust survivors at the same time make plans to manipulate the water supply in several large cities in occupied Germany by poisoning the drinking water in retaliation for the Holocaust and other crimes committed during World War II.

Production and distribution 
Plan A was written and directed by Yoav and Doron Paz. Filming took place in Germany, Israel, and Ukraine. It is based on Israeli historian Dina Porat's book Vengeance and Retribution Are Mine, about the Nakam.

Signature Entertainment obtained distribution rights in the United Kingdom, Ireland, Australia, and New Zealand. Twelve Oaks Pictures obtained distribution rights in Spain.

Reception 
The Guardian Cath Clarke rated the film two out of five stars.

References

External links 

 

Films about the aftermath of the Holocaust
Films based on books
German war drama films
Israeli war drama films
Films shot in Germany
Films shot in Israel
Films shot in Ukraine
2021 films
2020s English-language films
Israeli historical drama films